Nathaniel Johnson, also known as Fam-Lay (born May 28, 1974) is an American rapper.

Biography 
Signed to The Neptunes' Star Trak imprint, he first gained notoriety through several guest appearances he made on various Neptunes-related projects, including the Clipse's debut album Lord Willin' in 2002. He also later appeared on The Neptunes' compilation The Neptunes Present... Clones in 2003, which featured his song "Rock 'N Roll". Then in 2004 he had the single and video "Rock N Roll (Remix)" featuring Lil Flip. It gained heavy rotation on MTV Jams.  He also was featured in the video game Def Jam: Fight for New York (2004) in which he was a playable/fightable character added into the storyline.

He planned to release his debut album, titled Traintogo, in March 2004, through a joint venture between Star Trak and Def Jam Recordings. Unlike most Neptunes-helmed projects, where Pharrell and Chad Hugo handle almost all of the production duties, Traintogo was unique in that it was to feature production from outside producers, including Lil' Jon and David Banner. After suffering several delays, Traintogo failed to meet its scheduled release date. To further complicate matters, Fam-Lay's deal with Def Jam fell through, and he was dropped from the label in July 2004. Traintogo still has yet to be released.

In the mid 2010’s Fam-Lay discovered the rapper BIA through YouTube and later introduced her to Pharrell.

Discography

Mixtape
2004: Star Trak Presents: Fam-Lay (Hosted by DJ Cipha Sounds)
2005: Grand Theft Ghetto (Shark City) (Hosted by DJ Noe Dout)
2008: DirtyWay - Never released

Singles
2003: "Rock 'N Roll"
2006: "Da Beeper Record"
2007: "No Time 4 No's" , featuring Pharrell & The Clipse
2012: "Clap Clap"

Guest appearances
(All songs feature Fam-Lay unless otherwise noted)

Video game appearances
Fam-Lay is a playable character in the video game Def Jam: Fight for NY.

References

1974 births
African-American male rappers
Living people
Musicians from Norfolk, Virginia
Rappers from Virginia
Southern hip hop musicians
21st-century American rappers
21st-century American male musicians
21st-century African-American musicians
20th-century African-American people